The 1912 All-Ireland Senior Football Championship Final was the 25th All-Ireland Final and the deciding match of the 1912 All-Ireland Senior Football Championship, an inter-county Gaelic football tournament for the top teams in Ireland. 

At half time Louth led 0-2 to 0-1.
Antrim led by two points with fifteen minutes to go, but Louth came back to win their title.

References

Gaelic football
All-Ireland Senior Football Championship Finals
Antrim county football team matches
Louth county football team matches